Justice Wamfor (born 5 August 1981) is a retired Cameroonian footballer who played as a midfielder. 
He previously played for Racing Club Bafoussam, RC Genk, Germinal Beerschot and more recently for Israeli Premier League side Maccabi Petah Tikva and Royal Antwerp.

External links

Guardian Football
 

1981 births
Living people
Cameroonian footballers
Cameroon international footballers
Cameroonian expatriate footballers
Association football midfielders
K.R.C. Genk players
Beerschot A.C. players
Maccabi Petah Tikva F.C. players
Royal Antwerp F.C. players
Belgian Pro League players
Challenger Pro League players
Expatriate footballers in Israel
Israeli Premier League players